Douai School was a public (private) school run by the Douai Abbey Benedictine community at Woolhampton, England, until it closed in 1999.

History

1615–1818 

The monastic community was founded in Paris in 1615 and moved to Douai after the French Revolution taking over the former buildings of the community of St Gregory. The monastery provided educational opportunities from the beginning, but had no formal school in its first decades of existence. A boarding school later emerged in a dependent priory at La Celle.

1818–1903 

Following the move to Douai in 1818, and the refoundation of the community by Richard Marsh, a more recognisable school emerged and by 1823, there were 28 boys on the roll. Around that time, the fees for students were being advertised at £32 a year or £30 for church students. Links with the Roman Catholic dioceses in England were crucial to the school's survival. In the 1880s the Roman Catholic Archdiocese of Birmingham was sending seven boys a year to the school. Rather than the vertical house system of English schools, Douai retained the horizontal divisions of 'Rhetoric', 'Poetry', 'Grammar' and 'Syntax' throughout the nineteenth century, and even for a time in its new home in England.

1903–1999 

The modern school in Woolhampton, Berkshire was formed by the site's pre-existing St Mary's College's merging with the school of the incoming Benedictine community that moved from Douai in June 1903 as a result of Waldeck-Rousseau's Law of Associations (1901). Former pupils lobbied the Irish Parliamentary Party to raise the matter of the expulsion in Parliament. However it was Roman Catholic English Conservatives who espoused the cause: Lord Edmund Talbot in the House of Commons and 11th Lord Herries of Terregles in the House of Lords.

The merger produced a school of 109 boy boarders, which had fallen to only 63 by 1911. Its long history in France and its monastic influence meant that Douai, although an independent boarding school, had in large part escaped the influence of the public school ethos that had developed in 19th-century England. However, in 1920, Douai was admitted to membership of the Headmasters' Conference. In the 1930s David Matthew, later Apostolic Delegate for Africa, congratulated the headmaster, Ignatius Rice, on the fact that: "no Catholic school has been so free from the influence of Arnold of Rugby as Douai has been."

Day boys were admitted from the early 1960s, when annual boarding fees were £360. By 1984, there was a record number of 333 pupils. The school became co-educational in 1993.

post closure 

In November 2017 a former House Master at Douai, Father Michael Creagh, was found guilty at Reading Crown Court of two counts of child abuse offences which were committed while he was at the Boarding School.

Headmasters 

The first headmaster was not appointed until 1909, replacing the older system of a Prefect of Studies and a Prefect of Discipline jointly managing the school under the oversight of the Abbot. A series of headmasters followed in quick succession, before stability was provided by Fr Ignatius Rice (headmaster 1915–1952).

Ignatius Rice was a friend of G. K. Chesterton whose Father Brown novels were based on Father O'Connor, a mutual friend, and he was influential in Chesterton's conversion to Roman Catholicism in 1922. In his younger days he played cricket for Warwickshire during the summer holidays and for some years enjoyed the distinction of being the only monk whose cricket performances were chronicled in Wisden.

In 2005, Edmund Power (headmaster 1993–97) was elected Abbot of the Basilica of Saint Paul Outside the Walls in Rome.

List of Headmasters 

 Fr Adrian Coughlin OSB (1909–1911)
 Fr Laurence Powell OSB (1911–1915)
 Fr Antony Richardson OSB (1915)
 Fr Ignatius Rice OSB (1915–1952)
 Fr Alphonsus Tierney OSB (1952–1973)
 Fr Brian Murphy OSB (1973–1975)
 Fr Wilfrid Sollom OSB PhD DIC (1975–1987)
 Fr Geoffrey Scott OSB PhD FSA FRHistS (1987–1993)
 Fr Edmund Power OSB PhD (1993–1997)
 Peter McLaughlin PhD (1997–1999)

Buildings 

In 1786 the Earl of Fingall, the squire of Woolhampton sold his Woolhampton estate and moved to Ireland. His family had been recusant Roman Catholics and had maintained a chapel and chaplain at Woolhampton House (now Elstree School). Three of these cottages stood on the site of the entrance tower, and in one of these, Woolhampton Lodge, the priest lived and had a chapel.

The oldest part of the current buildings date from around 1830. The main entrance and tower were constructed in 1888 in the Tudor Gothic style; the architect was Frederick Walters. In 1829 Fr Stephen Dambrine was appointed to Woolhampton. He embarked on a building programme which included a chapel in the Gothic style opened in 1833 to replace the chapel in Woolhampton Lodge, and which itself was replaced by the present St Mary's in 1848.

The cricket pavilion was built in 1922 to honour the 56 Old Boys of both Douai and St Mary's College who were killed in the First World War.

In the early years at Woolhampton, the school was seen as an appendage to the monastery and it was only with the foundation of a separate abbey church in the 1930s and the creation of distinct school and monastic refectories in 1944 that a degree of separation emerged. The Monastery was greatly expanded in the 1960s with the building of the new monastery designed by Sir Frederick Gibberd.

Haydock Hall, the study hall, was briefly converted into a film set for the shooting of the dormitory scenes in the 1990 film Three Men and a Little Lady. The former school buildings were also used as a location for the 2002 television film of Goodbye, Mr. Chips.

After the closure of the School, the site was developed by Bewley Homes. The theatre block, swimming pool, science laboratories and Ditcham house were demolished, and were replaced by new housing. The main school buildings were redeveloped as private housing.

The gatehouse, hall and three blocks of buildings are grade II* listed.

In July 2017, a clubhouse for Old Boys and a museum was opened on the site of the former cricket pavilion.

Houses 

In 1951, the school was finally divided into houses, each under a monastic housemaster: Samson House, named after Abbot Samson of medieval Bury St Edmunds; Faringdon House, named after the martyred last abbot of Reading Abbey Hugh Faringdon; Walmesley House, after Bishop Charles Walmesley, the eighteenth-century member of the Community who had been a mathematician and astronomer. In 1980, a new house was created Gifford House, to commemorate Archbishop Gabriel Gifford. Faringdon ceased to exist in 1992, again leaving just three Houses.

Former pupils 

Former pupils are known as Old Dowegians and are eligible to join the Douai Society, founded in 1868.

Notable former pupils include:

La Celle 
Patrick Cary (c.1623-57), poet
Rev Francis Fenwick (1645–94), monk
Henry Howard (1757-1842), historian
Henry Swinburne (1743-1803), travel writer
Sir John Swinburne, Bt (1762-1860), Whig MP

St Edmund's College, Douai 
Most Rev James Billsborrow (1862–1931), Archbishop of Cardiff
William Canton (1845–1926), author
Rt Rev Bernard Collier (1802–90), Bishop of Port-Louis
Rt Rev William Cotter (1866–1940), Bishop of Portsmouth
Rt Rev Joseph Cowgill (1860–1936), Bishop of Leeds
Edward Micklethwaite Curr (1820-1889), Australian settler
Gustave Doyen (1836-1923), French painter
Rt Rev Robert Fraser (1858-1914), Bishop of Dunkeld
Rt Rev Matthew Harkins (1845-1921), American Bishop of Providence
Michael A. Healy (1839–1904), US Coast Guard commander
Most Rev Dr Frederick Keating (1859-1928), Archbishop of Liverpool
Most Rev John McIntyre (1855-1935), Archbishop of Birmingham
Rt Rev John McNulty (1879-1943), Bishop of Nottingham
Monsignor John O'Connor (1870-1952), priest
 Most Rev Benedict Scarisbrick OSB (1828-1908), Archbishop of Cyzicus
Rt Rev Thomas Pearson OSB (1870-1938), Bishop of Lancaster
Fr Ignatius Rice OSB (1883-1955), headmaster
Luis Subercaseaux (1882-1973), Chilean athlete and diplomat
Pedro Subercaseaux (1880-1956), Chilean painter and priest
Georges Tattegrain (1845-1916), French lawyer and poet

St Mary's College, Woolhampton 
A.M. Burrage (1889–1956), author
Rt Rev Arthur Doubleday (1865-1951), Bishop of Brentwood

Douai School, Woolhampton 
Juan Edgardo Angara (1972– ), Filipino politician
Adrian Dally (1966- ), former senior civil servant, including private secretary to two cabinet ministers, and currently Director of Motor Finance and Strategy at the Finance and Leasing Association
Anthony Bertram (1897–1978), art historian and novelist
Michael Blower MBE (1929–1999), architect
Sir Daniel Brabin MC QC (1913–75), judge
Pablo Casado Blanco (1981- ), Spanish Leader of the Opposition 
Sir Edward William Dutton Colt, Bt (1936– )
 Simon Craven (1961–90), 8th Earl of Craven 
J. A. Cuddon (1928–96), writer 
Tristan Davies (1956– ), journalist
Christopher Derrick (1921–2007), writer
Michael Derrick (1915–67), journalist and Liberal politician
Brian Andre Doyle (1911-2004), Chief Justice of Zambia
 Brigadier Hedley Duncan (1944– ), Yeoman Usher of the Black Rod
Ben Emmerson QC (1963– ), human rights lawyer
Guy Farley (1963- ), composer
Michael Geoghegan CBE (1953– ), Chief Executive of HSBC
Gerard Goalen (1919- ), architect
David Gold (1979- ), bridge player
Sir Brandon Gough DL (1937–2012), businessman
Lord Harvington (Sir Robert Grant-Ferris) (1907–97), Conservative politician
Rev Professor Adrian Hastings (1929–2001), historian
Dominic Hill (1969– ), theatre director
Paul Jennings (1918–98), journalist and humorist
P. J. Kavanagh (1931–2015), poet
Frank Keating (1937–2013), journalist, The Guardian
Colonel Chris Keeble DSO (1941– ) soldier, Parachute Regiment.
Prince Ludwig of Bavaria (1982– )
Norbert Lynton (1927–2007), art historian
David Mackay (1933–2014), architect
Patrick Malahide (1945– ), actor
Paul Mahoney (1946- ), judge
Most Rev Joseph Masterson (1899–1953), Archbishop of Birmingham
Professor Henry Mayr-Harting (1936– ), historian
Vice Admiral Sir Timothy McClement KCB OBE (1951– )
 Senator Edward McGuire (1901–92), Irish politician
Squadron Leader Robin McNair DFC (1918–96), RAF pilot and businessman
 Hamish Miles (1925-2017), art historian
 Tim Miller (1940- ), financier and founder of Charter88
Anthony Milner (1925–2002), composer
Professor D.P. O'Brien (1939– ), economist
Terry Oldfield (1949- ), composer
David Peacock (1924-2000), theatre manager
James Pelly-Fry DSO (1911–94), RAF pilot
Kevin Porée (1965– ), composer and producer
Michael Randle (1933– ), peace campaigner
Christopher Rudd (1963– ), cricketer
 Cecil Stafford Northcote OBE KSG (1912-2003), High Sheriff of Staffordshire
Colonel 'Tod' Sweeney MC (1919–2001), soldier and charity director
James Theunissen (1981- ), cricketer
Geoff Usher-Somers MBE (1950- ), explorer
Monsignor Gerard Tickle (1909–94), Bishop of the Forces
Michael Tuffrey (1959– ), Liberal Democrat politician
Sir Stephen Wall GCMG LVO (1947– ), diplomat
Louis Wharton (1896–1957), cricketer

Fictional characters include:

 Henry Meadows, the protagonist in 'Turbulence' by Giles Foden

The Douai Society tie is black with thin multiple stripes of yellow, red, yellow, navy, yellow.

Sport 

Association football was introduced to the "old" school in the late 1880s. Before this, football was played to particular rules which allowed the use of hands and forbade any kicking backwards. Cricket had been played for many years in the old quad, but in 1885 a new pitch was laid at Douai's country house in Planques.

External fixtures, which were unknown at old Douai, were soon organized after the move to England. Cricket and hockey were played at the new school from 1905, and from 1918 to 1919 rugby union replaced soccer as the main winter sport (soccer returned as a minor sport in 1962). In 1920, the Trinidadian Louis Wharton became Douai's first Oxford University cricketer, having won a Blue for soccer the previous year. He went on to play cricket for Somerset. After the war the Surrey all-rounder Alan Peach was cricket coach, succeeded by Frank Shipston of Nottinghamshire. An indoor swimming pool was built in 1937.

A group of spectators (at Twickenham) associated with the school is credited with introducing the song Swing Low, Sweet Chariot as an English rugby union anthem.

Uniform 

In the 1890s mortar boards were introduced but this innovation was soon abandoned. Eton collars were worn until the 1920s together with a blue cap surmounted by the arms of St Edmund or a bowler hat. For daily use, boys wore a morning suit. In the summer, the uniform consisted of an Oxford grey suit and a boater. Uniform gradually became more casual and, after 1945, a variety of grey suits was recognised uniform, with blazers worn in the summer. In the early years, members of the Douai cricket XI would wear full ties around the waist and half ties from their collars.

Junior School 

In 1948 a preparatory school (Douai Junior School) was opened at Ditcham Park, in the South Downs near Petersfield in Hampshire.  The house was formerly a convalescent home requisitioned by the Royal Navy during World War II.

Boys joined the school at aged 8 and after taking the Common Entrance Examination, aged approximately 13, joined the 'Big School' in Woolhampton. In 1976 the boys from the junior school moved to the Woolhampton site and a new Ditcham House was added to Samson, Walmesley, Faringdon and Gifford Houses.

In 1976 a non-denominational school was opened at Ditcham Park.

Douai Foundation 

In 2019, a charitable foundation was established to promote Benedictine education at home and abroad, with the Duchess of Somerset as its Patron, and Emma Catherine Rigby, Pablo Casado Blanco and Robin Dyer among its ambassadors.

Footnotes

External links
Douai Abbey
Douai Foundation
Douai Society
Old Dowegians Cricket Club
1998 performance tables

Defunct schools in West Berkshire District
Educational institutions disestablished in 1999
Schools of the English Benedictine Congregation
Educational institutions established in the 1610s
1615 establishments in England
Defunct Catholic schools in the Diocese of Portsmouth
1999 disestablishments in England
Frederick Walters buildings
Grade II listed buildings in Berkshire
Schools in Nord (French department)
Woolhampton
Defunct boarding schools in England